The 2009 Neste Oil Rally Finland was the 59th running of the Rally Finland and the ninth round of the 2009 World Rally Championship season. The rally consisted of 23 special stages and was won by Ford's Mikko Hirvonen. This marked his third victory in a row and his first in his home event. Last year's winner Sébastien Loeb of Citroën finished second and took his first podium since the Rally Argentina back in April. Jari-Matti Latvala beat Dani Sordo to the final podium spot.

Entries
The final entry list included 90 crews – the highest number in any event this season. 18 drivers contested the event in the top category World Rally Car and ten were registered for the Junior World Rally Championship. In addition to usual names, Matti Rantanen, who finished seventh in last year's event in a private Ford Focus RS WRC 06, partnered Federico Villagra in the Munchi's Ford World Rally Team and drove the 2008-spec Focus WRC.

Ferrari's 2007 Formula One world champion Kimi Räikkönen made his WRC debut at the event. This was also his first rally on gravel, after competing in two snow rallies in Finland and in a tarmac rally in Italy. As previously, he drove the Super 2000 class Fiat Grande Punto Abarth prepared by Tommi Mäkinen Racing. Räikkönen faced competition from other S2000 entrants such as Juho Hänninen, Anton Alén and Janne Tuohino and from Group N drivers such as Patrik Flodin. Former Stobart M-Sport Ford driver Urmo Aava entered the event in a Honda Civic Type-R R3.

Entry List

Summary

As in the previous year's event, the battle for the win was between the title contenders Mikko Hirvonen of Ford and Sébastien Loeb of Citroën. Although Loeb proved faster on the opening super special stage, Hirvonen took the lead when the rally really got underway on Friday, and began building up a lead by about a second per stage. Loeb backed off and settled for second after damaging a tyre and losing 13 seconds on SS15. Hirvonen's win was his first in his home event, after finishing runner-up to Marcus Grönholm in 2007 and to Loeb in 2008. Jari-Matti Latvala, who suffered from food poisoning on day two, passed Dani Sordo to take his first podium in his home event. Petter Solberg also looked set to challenge for a podium place, but suffered a puncture and then went wide and got stuck in a ditch right at the end of the fourth stage.

Munchi's Ford driver Matti Rantanen took a career-best fifth place in only his second rally in a World Rally Car. After Stobart's Henning Solberg, Rantanen's main challenger for the position, retired with a broken suspension, Rantanen was chased down by Citroën Junior Team's Sébastien Ogier. Ogier closed to within 0.6 seconds before the final stage but a time only 0.3 seconds faster than Rantanen's kept him in sixth place. Ogier's teammates Evgeny Novikov and Conrad Rautenbach both crashed out. Novikov crashed on both Friday and Saturday mornings while Rautenbach held ninth place until his accident on the penultimate stage.

Jari Ketomaa made his World Rally Car debut in a private Subaru Impreza WRC2007 and was another driver to challenge for fifth, the "best of the rest" position. He incurred a puncture and struggled with steering damage on Friday, losing over a minute, but recovered to overtake Stobart's Matthew Wilson for eighth and then began closing in on Mads Østberg in a year newer Impreza WRC. As the Norwegian crashed out on SS19, Ketomaa took the seventh place and his first-ever WRC points, and Wilson eighth and his first-ever point in the Rally Finland. Khalid al-Qassimi finished ninth and production class winner Juho Hänninen beat Munchi's Federico Villagra for tenth place. Martin Prokop won the Junior World Rally Championship category and secured the junior world title. Crowd favourite Kimi Räikkönen impressed in his WRC debut. Despite engine trouble, he held third place in the production class until rolling out at exactly the same place as Østberg. Räikkönen's performance drew praise from the top rally drivers.

Results

Special stages

Championship standings after the event

Drivers' championship

Manufacturers' championship

References

External links

Official website
Event at WRC.com

Finland
Rally Finland
Rally Finland